This is a list of active and extinct volcanoes in Madagascar.

References

Madagascar
 
Volcanoes